Sambaran Banerjee (born 1 November 1953) is a cricket coach, a columnist, TV analyst and was an administrator in the Cricket Association of Bengal. In addition to it he was also the chief selector of Bengal Cricket Team. He resigned from the title of chief selector after the selection of Debang Gandhi as the chief selector on 3 December 2015. He was a former Bengal cricketer and led Bengal to a Prolfic Ranji Win.

He was also a cricket selector for the Indian cricket team, selecting Sourav Ganguly as the captain of Indian Cricket Team.

Filmography 
Chalo Paltai (2011)

References

Indian cricketers
Bengali cricketers
Bengal cricketers
East Zone cricketers
1953 births
Living people